James Geary (born 1962) is an American writer, former Europe editor of Time and deputy curator of the Nieman Foundation for Journalism at Harvard. In this role he is also editor of Nieman Reports, oversees other Nieman print and online publications and manages a range of duties related to the Nieman Fellowship program and the foundation's journalism outreach efforts.

Among his journalistic credits, apart from his work at Time, Geary was Editor at Large for Ode magazine and writes online for The Huffington Post, Salon.com and the Certified Financial Planner Board of Standards Inc's Newsletter.

Career 
Geary graduated from Bennington College. and he teaches at the Harvard Extension School.

Geary's literary efforts include Geary’s Guide to the World's Great Aphorists (2007), claimed to be the largest collection of aphorisms in the English language, and follows on from his previous volume on aphorists and aphorisms, The World in a Phrase (2006). It was published in the UK — but now out of print — as We Are What We Think. It has also been published in Brazilian Portuguese — as O Mundo em uma Frase — as well as Korean. Geary also wrote a popular science book called The Body Electric (2002), a survey of cybernetic projects attempting to replace or enhance human biological senses (also published in Spain as El Cuerpo Electrónico), and two much earlier books of poetry written while he was a student in San Francisco, 17 Reasons Why and Words for Refrigerator Doors.

Geary wrote I Is an Other: The Secret Life of Metaphor and How It Shapes the Way We See the World, (Harper, February 8, 2011), described on his website as "a fascinating look at metaphors and their influence in every aspect of our lives, from ordinary conversation and commercial messaging to news reports and political speeches". The book has also been translated into Mandarin Chinese.

Geary publishes a blog about aphorisms, All Aphorisms, All The Time, via his website, and Tweets via the account @JamesGeary. He is also a regular speaker at literary festivals where he gives a largely unscripted lecture on aphorisms which includes his juggling routine.

Family 
He is married with three children.

Works 

 The Body Electric: An Anatomy of the New Bionic Senses, Rutgers University Press, 2002 
 The World in a Phrase: A Brief History of the Aphorism, Bloomsbury, 2005 
 We Are What We Think: A Journey Through the Wisest and Wittiest Sayings in the World, James Geary, 2005 
 Geary’s Guide to the World's Great Aphorists, Bloomsbury, 2007 
 I Is an Other: The Secret Life of Metaphor and How It Shapes the Way We See the World, Harper, 2011 
 Wit's End: What Wit Is, How It Works, and Why We Need It, W. W. Norton, 2018

References

External links
 
 Geary at The Huffington Post
 Geary at Salon.com
 Geary at the Certified Financial Planner Board of Standards, Inc's Newsletter
 

1962 births
Living people
American male journalists
People associated with The Institute for Cultural Research
Harvard Extension School faculty